Via Militaris or Via Diagonalis was an ancient Roman road, starting from Singidunum (today the Serbian capital Belgrade), passing by Danube coast to Viminacium (modern Požarevac), through Naissus (modern Niš), Serdica (modern Sofia), Philippopolis (modern Plovdiv), Adrianopolis (modern Edirne in Turkish Thrace), and reaching Constantinople (modern Istanbul). This road was connected with Via Egnatia by other roads: the road along the Axios (or Vardar) River, the road from Serdica to Thessalonica along the Strymon (or Struma) River, and the road from Philippopolis to Philippi.

It was built in the 1st century AD. The length from Singidunum to Constantinople was 924 kilometres.

During the first European conquests of Ottoman Turks orta kol (lit. middle arm) was following the Via Militaris.

In May 2010, while work was done on the Pan-European Corridor X in Serbia, well-preserved remains of the road were excavated in Dimitrovgrad, Serbia. The eight-metre wide road was constructed from large blocks of stone and had two lanes.

Key towns

References

Stephen Mitchell: The administration of Roman Asia from 133 BE to AD 250 in Lokale Autonomie und römische Ordnungsmacht in den kaiserzeitlichen Provinzen vom 1. bis 3. Jahrhundert (Oldenbourg Wissenschaftsverlag 1999, S. 18) ([ restricted online version (Google Books)])
Fred Singleton, Frederick Bernard Singleton: A Short History of the Yugoslav Peoples. Cambridge University Press 1985,, S. 12 [ restricted online version (Google Books)])

Militaris
Roman sites in Serbia
Roman sites in Bulgaria
Roman sites in Turkey
Roman Thrace
Serbia in the Roman era
Moesia
Romanization of Southeastern Europe